The Women's 2. Volleyball Bundesliga or in (German : Die 2. Volleyball-Bundesliga der Frauen) is the second highest division in German women's volleyball.

In this competition, two leagues (North  and South ) are played, there is one round of matches with first and second legs. The first-placed team (champion) in each of these leagues is promoted to the 1st Bundesliga , while the last two teams in each are relegated to the third league. In the event of increased relegation from the 1st Bundesliga to the same season of the 2nd Bundesliga, there may be one additional team relegated.

References

External links
 Volleyball-Bundesliga
 Dynamische Statistiken – Bundesliga-Datenbank des Suhler Fanclubs
  Frau 2 Bundesliga North.women.volleybox.net
  Frau 2 Bundesliga South.women.volleybox.net

Germany
1976 establishments in Germany
Women's volleyball in Germany 
2nd Bundesliga Germany
Sports leagues in Germany